Heikki Liimatainen, known professionally as Heikki L,  is a house music producer, DJ and remixer from Finland.

Biography
Heikki Liimatainen has released music under different aliases like Heikki L, Supermodels From Paris, Syndicate of Beats, Dallas Superstars, Modulation, Moovon, Spectro, Hemohes and Bostik. Under his current alias, Heikki L, he has produced many big house tracks and also remixed many artists. Liimatainen has his own studio in Helsinki and also runs Finland's biggest House Club, Danceteria with his partner Jere Hyvönen.
Heikki L is also a DJ and he has played together with DJs like Erick Morillo, Axwell, Sebastian Ingrosso.

Chart positions

Singles

References

External links 
http://www.djheikkil.com
http://www.myspace.com/djheikkil
https://www.facebook.com/djheikkil
http://www.discogs.com/artist/Heikki+Liimatainen

Remixers
Living people
Year of birth missing (living people)
Finnish electronic musicians
Finnish house musicians
Finnish record producers